"Shawskank", a modification of The Shawshank Redemption with skank, has been used by news commentators and comedians to refer to situations involving women and prison:

 News coverage of a 2007 case involving Paris Hilton
 "Shawskank Redemption", an episode of SuperNews! covering the 2007 case
 "The Shawskank Redemption", a parody ad run for The Chaser's War on Everything covering the 2007 case
 News coverage of the 2015 Clinton Correctional Facility escape